Shhh is the fifth studio album by British band Chumbawamba. It was originally written and recorded as Jesus H. Christ, an album that relied heavily on samples. The band was unable to procure rights to a number of the songs they sampled, however, and the album was largely re-worked to defend artistic intent and criticize censorship. The album sleeve artwork itself incorporated various rejection letters received by the band denying the rights to the Christ samples. "Shhh" is considered by many to be a "genre landmark."

The album was re-released with Slap! in the compilation Shhhlap!, released by MUTT Records on July 15, 2003.

Track listing
All songs written and produced by Chumbawamba, except where noted.

Original Jesus H. Christ track listing & notes
1. "Intro"
A 10-second sample of the intro to the Beatles' 1967 album Sgt. Pepper's Lonely Hearts Club Band. Not used on Shhh. Allegedly, original vinyl copies of this LP open with a few seconds of high-pitched tone before the intro, most likely referencing the 15 kHz tone inserted at the end of English Sgt. Pepper's LPs to "irritate listeners' dogs."
2. "Alright Now"
Uses the melody of "All Right Now" by Free, as well as the chorus of "That's The Way (I Like It)" by KC and the Sunshine Band. Has a large sample from the movie The Loneliness of the Long Distance Runner. Did not reappear on Shhh.
3. "Don't Fence Me In"
A cover version.  Did not reappear on Shhh.
4. "Money Money Money"
A medley of "Snip Snip Snip" and "Pop Star Kidnap"; uses the chorus from "Money Money Money" by ABBA, as well as bits of "Money (That's What I Want)" and "Who Wants to Be a Millionaire?" Incidentally, this song seems to end very abruptly, leading very awkwardly into the next track.
5. "Solid Gold Easy Action"
Became "Sometimes Plunder"; uses the chorus from "Solid Gold Easy Action" by T.Rex, as well as a brief melody from Rhapsody in Blue by George Gershwin. Does not yet include MC Fusion's rap verse.
6. "Silly Love Songs"
Somewhat resembles "Behave"; uses a line from "Silly Love Songs" by Wings, as well as lyrics from "Little Lies" by Fleetwood Mac and "Gimme Some Truth" by John Lennon. MC Fusion's opening rap, the piano melody, and the "behave!" sample all reappeared in "Behave" on Shhh.
7. "Get Off My Cloud"
Alternate take of "Look! No Strings!" featuring a different ending derived from the chorus of "Get Off Of My Cloud" by The Rolling Stones
8. "Stairway to Heaven"
A version of "Happiness Is Just a Chant Away" with a drastically different instrumental backing; uses the chorus of "Everybody's Happy Nowadays" by Buzzcocks. Incidentally, unlike the other tracks on the album, the title does not match with a prominent sample – though Led Zeppelin's "Stairway to Heaven" is only heard as a vague string rendition of the "if there's a bustle in your hedgerow" melody, appearing under the main composition directly after the verses.
9. "Big Mouth Strikes Again"
Very different mix compared to the Shhh version; does not include Fusion's rap verse. Incidentally, if one listens closely to the Shhh version, the harmonica that is heard on this version makes a very brief and quiet appearance, probably by accident.
10. "Street Music"
Sound collage that became the end of "Snip Snip Snip" on Shhh. Sometimes referred to as "Street Sounds".
11. "I Should Be So Lucky"
Became "You Can't Trust Anyone Nowadays"; uses the chorus from "I Should Be So Lucky" by Kylie Minogue, as well as lines from "I Heard It Through the Grapevine" by Marvin Gaye and "Brown Shoes Don't Make It" by the Mothers of Invention.
12. "Stitch That"
Similar to the Shhh version, except the music consists entirely of looped samples from Sgt. Pepper's Lonely Hearts Club Band (Reprise). The voice after the "A Day In The Life" piano chord says "What about the album?" and not "Shhh!".

Other Shhh-era tracks
 "I Never Gave Up" – A-side.  A remake of the track from Slap!, available in two versions – the Rondo Mix and the Cass Mix.  The Cass Mix includes a clip of Spinal Tap's Viv Savage saying his motto, "Have a good time, all the time."  This would later reappear in the lyrics of "Look! No Strings!".
 "Laughing" – B-side to above.  Essentially a variation on "I Never Gave Up", this was re-recorded with a new chorus to become the title track of Shhh.
 "Behave" – A-side.  Similar to the album version, albeit with a full set of new lyrics.  The single included three mixes – an original version, the Brittle Mix, and a hidden version containing only voice and percussion.
 "Misbehave" – B-side to above, no relation to its similarly titled counterpart.  Both an original version and the Brittle Mix were included on the single.
 "Harry's Ambient Mantra" – Not quite a Shhh-era track; actually recorded in the transition period between Shhh and Anarchy.  This would have been the B-side to "Hat Trick for Harry," an unreleased single track whose ending section appeared as "Blackpool Rock" on Anarchy.  However, this track bore no relation to the A-side, being a lengthy ambient remix of "Happiness Is Just a Chant Away."  While never officially released in full, a small portion appeared as a hidden track on the Uneasy Listening compilation.

Personnel
Lou Watts - vocals, keyboard
 Alice Nutter - vocals, habit, rabbit
 Danbert Nobacon - vocals, elastic band, foam
 Mavis Dillon - bass guitar, vocals, trumpet
 Harry Hamer - drums, percussion, Octopus's Garden
 Boff Whalley - guitar, vocals, refrigerator
 Dunstan Bruce – vocals, percussion, hammering

with
 Simon "Commonknowledge" Lanzon – keyboards, accordion, voice
 MC Fusion – vocals
 Neil Ferguson – guitar, keyboards, engineering
 Geoff Slaphead – fiddle
 Howard Storey – vocals

References

Chumbawamba albums
1992 albums
Agit-Prop Records albums
Southern Records albums
Sampling controversies